Fall of Antioch may refer to:

Battle of the Iron Bridge (637 AD)
Siege of Antioch (1098)
Siege of Antioch (1268)